Events from the year 1686 in England.

Incumbents
 Monarch – James II
 Parliament – Loyal

Events 
 21 June – judgement in the case of Godden v. Hales affirms the king's power to exercise his dispensing powers granting exemptions from anti-Catholic legislation. Heneage Finch is dismissed as Solicitor General for his refusal to defend the king's case.
 10 July – Court of Ecclesiastical Commission created.
 17 July – King James appoints four Catholics to the Privy Council of England.
 5 November – Bar Convent in York established, making it the oldest surviving active Catholic convent in England.

Undated
 A group of conspirators meet at Charborough House in Dorset to plan the overthrow of James II by Parliamentarians and the Dutch Stadtholder William III of Orange-Nassau (James's son-in-law).

Publications
 Edmond Halley presents a systematic study of the trade winds and monsoons and identifies solar heating as the cause of atmospheric motions.
 John Playford publishes The Delightful Companion, containing the first publication of Henry Purcell's arrangement of "Lillibullero"; Thomas Wharton composes lyrics.
 Robert Plot publishes The Natural History of Staffordshire.

Births 
 6 March – Christopher Packe, medical doctor and geologist (died 1749)
 9 April – James Craggs the Younger, politician (died 1721)
 29 April – Peregrine Bertie, 2nd Duke of Ancaster and Kesteven, statesman (died 1742)
 5 June – Edward Howard, 9th Duke of Norfolk, aristocrat (died 1777; possibly born 1685)
 12 August – John Balguy, philosopher (died 1748)
 19 August – Eustace Budgell, writer (suicide 1737)
 30 November – Richard Lumley, 2nd Earl of Scarbrough, Whig politician (suicide 1740)

Unknown dates
 Thomas Carte, historian (died 1754)
 George Clinton, naval officer, colonial governor and politician (died 1761)
 Giles Jacob, legal writer and literary critic (died 1744)
 William Law, clergyman (died 1761)

Deaths 
 14 January – Sir Thomas Abdy, 1st Baronet, lawyer and landowner (born 1612)
 19 January – Simon Digby, 4th Baron Digby, politician (born 1657)
 10 February – Sir William Dugdale, antiquary (born 1605)
 15 April – Sir Joseph Ashe, 1st Baronet, Whig politician and merchant (born 1618)
 21 April – John Dolben, Archbishop of York (born 1625)
 28 May – Paskah Rose, butcher, executioner and burglar (birth unknown)
 23 June – Sir William Coventry, statesman (born c. 1628)
 10 July – John Fell, Bishop of Oxford (born 1625)
 16 July – John Pearson, theologian and scholar (born 1612)
 28 July (bur.) – Thomas Watson, nonconformist Puritan preacher and author (born c. 1620)
 26 October – John Egerton, 2nd Earl of Bridgewater, nobleman (born 1623)
 November – Jack Ketch, executioner employed by King Charles II (birth unknown)
 ca. November – John Playford, bookseller and music publisher (born 1623)

References

 
Years of the 17th century in England